The Bengaluru Open is a professional tennis tournament played on hard courts. It is currently part of the ATP Challenger Tour. It is held annually in Bangalore, India since 2015.

Past finals

Singles

Doubles

References

 
ATP Challenger Tour
Hard court tennis tournaments
Tennis tournaments in India
Recurring sporting events established in 2015